Bruce James Crowder (born March 25, 1957) is a Canadian former professional ice hockey forward who played four seasons in the National Hockey League (NHL) for the Boston Bruins and Pittsburgh Penguins from 1981–82 to 1984–85. He is the brother of Keith Crowder and also the brother of Craig Crowder.

Playing career
Crowder was drafted 153rd overall by the Philadelphia Flyers in the 1977 NHL amateur draft. He played 243 career NHL games, scoring 47 goals and 51 assists for 98 points. His best offensive season was the 1982–83 season when he garnered career highs in goals with 21, assists with 19, and points with 40.

Coaching career
After leaving the professional game, Crowder spent 14 seasons in the collegiate coaching ranks. Crowder spent the 1987–1988 and 1989–1990 as an assistant at the University of Maine, before joining UMass Lowell. In 1991, he was promoted to the head coach of the River Hawks and posted a record of 11–19–4. In the following four seasons with UMass Lowell Crowder's record was an impressive 88–56–15, and in 1996 he took over the head coaching job at Northeastern where he was 124–168–33 over 9 seasons, finishing last in the conference 4 times. He was released from his coaching responsibilities at Northeastern in the Spring of 2005 and was replaced by Greg Cronin.

Career statistics

Head coaching record

References

External links

1957 births
Boston Bruins players
Calgary Cowboys draft picks
Canadian ice hockey forwards
Erie Blades players
Ice hockey people from Ontario
Living people
Maine Mariners players
New Hampshire Wildcats men's ice hockey players
Northeastern Huskies men's ice hockey coaches
People from Essex, Ontario
Philadelphia Flyers draft picks
Pittsburgh Penguins players